Ali Rabee may refer to:

 Ali Rabee (footballer, born 1981), Emirati football defender
 Ali Rabee (footballer, born 1983), Emirati football goalkeeper